Bitolino is an annual children theater festival held in August in organization of the Babec Theater, every year professional children theaters from all over the world participate in the festival. The main prize is the Grand Prix for best performance. The attendance for this festival has exceeded 10,000.

Participating theaters

Jury members
Valentina Gramosli (Actress) 2016 
Yavor Zehirov (Puppet master) 2016 
Nikola Projchevski (Actor) 2016 
Jovan Ristovski (director) 2015
Valentina Lutts  (Director/Manager of Theatre "At Narva Gates") 2015
Sonja Mihajlovska (Actor) 2015
Bojana Artinovska-Trpcheska (Artist) 2014
Valdet Rama (Director/Manager of Dodona Theater) 2014
Boris Chorevski (Actor)-2014
Sunchica Unevska (Journalist)-2013
Şehsuvar Aktaş (Actor) – 2013
Jasmina Vasileva (Actor)-2013
Nada Kokotovich (Director) – 2012
Petar Mirchevski (Actor) – 2012
Aneta Blazevska (Journalist) – 2012

Grand Prix for the Best Performance 

Grand Prix for Best Performance is the only award of the festival and is awarded to the best performance from the official competition. The award is decided by three-member international jury chosen from among world-renowned theatre artist and theoreticians.
Laureates:
2012 – Tiyatrotem Theater (Istanbul, Turkey) for the performance We can't go on like this
2013 – David Zuazola Puppets Company (Santiago, Chile) for the performance Dirty Wing
2014 – Mala Scena Theater (Zagreb, Croatia) for the performance Funny Monster
2015- Ruti Tamir Mime and Puppet Theater  (Modi'in-Maccabim-Re'ut, Israel) for the performance Four Fables and Queen 
2016- Theatre for children at Narva Gates (Saint Petersburg, Russia)  for the performance The Little Prince  

The Grand Prix was not awarded in 2017 and 2018.

References

Children's festivals in North Macedonia
Tourist attractions in Bitola
Summer events in North Macedonia